Maison Dieu (French for "House of God"), plural Maisons Dieu, referred to a type of hospital or almshouse.

Examples include:
 Maison Dieu, Dover
 Maison Dieu, Faversham
  Maison Dieu, (Singleton, New South Wales)

See also 
 La Maison Dieu (disambiguation)